Southern Hummingbird is the debut studio album by American singer Tweet, released on April 2, 2002, by The Goldmind Inc. and Elektra Records. The album features production by Missy "Misdemeanor" Elliott, Timbaland, Craig Brockman, Nisan Stewart, guitarist John "Jubu" Smith, and Tweet herself. It also features guest vocals by Elliott, Bilal, and Ms. Jade, and included a bonus track performed by Elliott, "Big Spender", which samples the song of the same name from the 1966 musical Sweet Charity.

The album was met with positive reviews from music critics, who commended the album's musical direction and its lyrical content. The album debuted at number three on the Billboard 200, selling 195,000 copies in its first week. Southern Hummingbird was certified gold by the Recording Industry Association of America (RIAA) on April 30, 2002, and by September 2015, it had sold 897,000 units in the United States.

The album was preceded by lead single "Oops (Oh My)", which reached number seven on the Billboard Hot 100 and number one on the Hot R&B/Hip-Hop Songs chart. Southern Hummingbird also spawned the singles "Call Me" and "Boogie 2nite", as well as the promotional single "Smoking Cigarettes".

Background

In the 1990s, Tweet was part of the female trio Sugah. During this time, Tweet met and formed a close friendship with Missy Elliott. She also met Timbaland, who would later provide production for Southern Hummingbird.

Music and lyrics

According to Keysha Davis from BBC Music, the album is a blend of blues, rootsy soul, and soft acoustic rock. Southern Hummingbird and Tweet were commended for creating a "mood in the room that might either make you want to take your clothes off or that of your significant others." Noting the album's musical style as groovy and "just feels good". Songs like "Smoking Cigarettes" were noticed for making the listener feel how Tweet feels.
Tweet's voice was compared to the album's title with critics saying "she's not called the Southern Hummingbird for no reason", describing her vocals as "[s]oft, gentle, emotional and captivating".

Lyrically the album fixates on the opposite sex, noted by The A.V. Club for its lyrical "intensity that borders on pathological". The album opens with Tweet "writhing in a pit of suicidal despair", followed by themes of Tweet singing about chastised cheating men, pined for the commitment-phobic, offered to take back lovers, and generally behaved like a strong woman whose happiness is nevertheless dependent almost entirely on her romantic entanglements."
The album's lyrics received large amounts of praise with reviewers say Tweet has a way with words continuing to say "songs like 'Beautiful' helped us understand how lyrics can move people."

The album's third song "Smoking Cigarettes" is described as a "lush, laid back affair" which incorporates "bluesy 70's soul" and multi-layered vocals, built over a snare drum. Lyrically the song is based on the idea of cigarette smoking being used as a coping mechanism. 
"Best Friend", featuring American singer Bilal, displays "lilting strings, exquisite vocals and heartbeat bass" noted for its use of "grassroots soul".
"Boogie 2nite" is a "feel-good" song that contains a repetitive "funky guitar riff" with lyrics discussing the "party vibe".
"Oops (Oh My)" is noted for its lyrical content which can be interpreted as discussing "female masturbation or a tribute to self-love." The song is built around a "superb groove" noted for its unmistakable Timbaland production. The song also contains "quick syncopated rhythms and Tweet's raspy vocals."
"Drunk" is an atmospheric song that continues to take influence from the idea of intoxicants, in the same vein as "Smoking Cigarettes". Lyrically the song sees Tweet broken and alone with only the aid of alcohol for company.

Singles
"Oops (Oh My)", featuring Missy "Misdemeanor" Elliott, was released as the album's lead single in January 2002. The song was a commercial success, reaching number seven on the US Billboard Hot 100, number one on the US Billboards Hot R&B/Hip-Hop Songs chart, and number five on the UK Singles Chart.

"Call Me" was released as the second single in April 2002. It peaked at number 31 on the Billboard Hot 100 and at number nine on the Hot R&B/Hip-Hop Songs chart, becoming Tweet's second consecutive top-10 entry on the latter chart. The track also reached number 35 in the United Kingdom.

The album's third and final single, "Boogie 2nite", was released solely in Europe in October 2002. After English dance music duo Booty Luv released a cover version of the track in November 2006, Tweet's original song charted at number 167 in the UK that same month.

Critical reception

Southern Hummingbird received generally positive reviews from music critics. At Metacritic, which assigns a normalized rating out of 100 to reviews from mainstream publications, the album received an average score of 73, based on 10 reviews. Stephen Thomas Erlewine of AllMusic praised the album's musical direction and production, but felt that Tweet fading into the mix.
The A.V. Club praised the album's lyrical content and Tweet's "sultry" vocals, continuing to say, "Tweet recognizes the value of subtlety and understatement, but she also skillfully writes and produces or co-produces much of her own material."
BBC Music gave Southern Hummingbird called the album "the stuff of real divas", adding that "Tweet's inherent melancholy further confirms the musical rite of passage in the tradition of other soul greats such as Aretha, Mary J Blige and Billie Holiday".

Dotmusic commended Tweet's vocals saying she has the "kind of voice that doesn't overpower her music but lets it breathe."
Entertainment Weekly gave the album a mixed review noting that the album's production was a highlight which helped to showcase her "breathy coo", while praising the "well-crafted" the critics felt the album contained "too-similar ballads."
Imran Ahmed of NME gave a positive reception towards the album's production and musical style saying the album is a "rarely thrilling collection of R&B"; however, he felt the album lacked front to back cohesiveness. Rolling Stone felt that "Oops" and "Make Ur Move" were highlights of the album, noting them for making "this hummingbird [fly]."

Commercial performance
Southern Hummingbird debuted at number three on the US Billboard 200, selling 195,000 copies in its first week. The album was certified gold by the Recording Industry Association of America (RIAA) on April 30, 2002, and had sold 897,000 copies in the United States as of September 2015. The album also fared well in European territories, peaking at number 15 on the UK Albums Chart.

Track listing

Notes
  signifies an additional producer

Sample credits
 "Motel" contains a sample of "Rapper's Delight" by The Sugarhill Gang.
 "Big Spender" contains a sample of "Big Spender" from Sweet Charity. The song appears only on initial pressings of the album.

Personnel
Credits adapted from the liner notes of Southern Hummingbird.

Musicians

 Tweet – vocals 
 Lil Charlie – lead guitar 
 John "Jubu" Smith – guitar 
 Bilal – vocals 
 Dontae – bass 
 Missy "Misdemeanor" Elliott – vocals 
 Greg Leiz – steel guitar 
 Ms. Jade – rap

Technical

 Nisan Stewart – production ; additional production 
 Craig Brockman – production ; additional production 
 Dylan Dresdow – engineering, mixing 
 Tweet – production ; executive production
 John "Jubu" Smith – production 
 Timbaland – production ; additional production ; executive production
 Jimmy Douglass – engineering ; mixing 
 Tyson Leeper – engineering 
 Missy "Misdemeanor" Elliott – production ; executive production
 Troy Johnson – production 
 Carlos Bedoya – engineering 
 Manny Marroquin – mixing 
 Bernie Grundman – mastering

Artwork
 Ruven Afanador – photography
 Anita Marisa Boriboon – art direction, design

Charts

Weekly charts

Year-end charts

Certifications

Release history

Notes

References

2002 debut albums
Albums produced by Craig Brockman
Albums produced by Missy Elliott
Albums produced by Timbaland
Albums recorded at Westlake Recording Studios
Elektra Records albums
Tweet (singer) albums